Muhammad Shahi is a Brahvi speaking Baloch tribe residing in the Kalat region of Balochistan. The Muhammad Shahi are from the Sarawan branch of Baloch tribes. In the early 1500s the tribe with helped the Qambrani's establish the Khanate of Kalat. There are approximately 20000 Muhammad Shahi Tribesmen residing in Balochistan As of the most recent census.

References

Bibliography

Brahui tribes
Social groups of Pakistan